Organic chocolate is chocolate which has been certified organic. As of 2016, it was a growing sector in the global chocolate industry. Organic chocolate is a socially-desirable product for some consumers.  Major brands, such as The Hershey Company, have begun to produce organic chocolate.

Sources
Many, if not most, producers of organic chocolate source their ingredients from certified fair trade cocoa farms and cooperatives. Organic chocolate comes in many varieties, including milk chocolate, white chocolate, and dark chocolate. Major brands of organic chocolate include Britain-based Green & Black's, Hershey-owned Dagoba Chocolate, and Equal Exchange.  Less-known retailers include Taza Chocolate, Pacari Chocolate, and Sacred Chocolate, a brand noted for producing raw chocolate.

Production Process 
The Seattle-based chocolate maker Theo Chocolate was one of the first companies that were "fair-trade certified" and produced Organic Chocolate. In 2006 Theo Chocolate began their production of organic chocolate, there were no solid guidelines for the manufacturing and they had to get the process and ingredients in the correct measurements. The main ingredient in chocolate, cocoa is going to be found close to the equator and the majority of it is grown in Western Africa. The organic cocoa, the main ingredient in organic chocolate, is sent to the chocolate factor where they arrive in burlap sacks. The cocoa beans are then thoroughly cleaned and foreign objects are removed until just the beans remain. The manufacturer makes sure to use all organic ingredients to ensure that the final product is truly organic.

See also

Raw chocolate
Environmental impact of cocoa production
Fair trade cocoa
Tropical rainforest conservation
Types of chocolate

References

 
Environmental certification
Environmental conservation
Forest conservation
Sustainable agriculture